Kharhara is a small town in Banka district in the state of Bihar, India. It is the birthplace of Satish Chandra Jha, one of seven martyrs Shaheed Smarak Patna who hoisted the flag of India at Patna Secretariat during 1942 Quit India Movement.

Geography
It has an average elevation of 79 metres (259 feet).

Demographics
According to Census 2011 information the location code of Kharhara is 241176. Kharhara is located in Barahat Tehsil of Banka district in Bihar, India. It is situated 4 km away from sub-district headquarter Barahat and 8 km away from district headquarter Banka. As per 2009 stats, Kharhara is the gram panchayat of Kharhara.

Climate

Literacy
Total 8076 people in the small town are literate, among them 5330 are male and 2745 are female. Literacy rate (children under 6 are excluded) of Kharhara is 60%. 74% of male and 44% of female population are literate here. Overall literacy rate in the town has increased by 10%. Male literacy has gone up by 6% and female literacy rate has gone up by 16%. Mr. Hussain started free online/offline internet marketing training classes for youth. for develop his career in this digital marketing industry, because in this time everything going to be digital. PM Modi hails Digital India, says it helped save Rs 2.25 lakh crore from falling in wrong hands. Digital India is a campaign launched by the Government of India in order to ensure the Government's services are made available to citizens electronically by improved online infrastructure and by increasing Internet connectivity or making the country digitally empowered in the field of technology.

Colleges

Bhagalpur College of Engineering
Bihar Agricultural University
Indian Institute of Information Technology, Bhagalpur
Jawaharlal Nehru Medical College and Hospital
Mahadeo Singh Law College
Marwari College, Bhagalpur
Tilka Manjhi Bhagalpur University
T.N.B. College, Bhagalpur

Economy 
Agriculture is the main profession of this town. This town going up in the Fishery, One of the biggest fish farm in this town. Still, this town is for Industrial development  Indian oil gas bottling plant,  School, Hotel Drinking water, Road, and Electricity from  400/132 KV POWERGRID KHARAHARA SUB-STATION are the main concern of this town. The young generation is more attracted towards mobile, Laptop and computer technology these days. If banks and finance institutions provide loan and other financial support to the young people, this town will see the real development.  Medical and health services have to be improved.

Notable people
 Satish Chandra Jha, Quit India movement (August 1942), to hoist the national flag on the (now) Secretariat building

Transport 
Bhagalpur Deoghar Road, Banka, Godda are the nearby by towns to Kharhara having road connectivity to Kharhara.

Barahat railway station, Punsia railway station are the very nearby railway stations to Kharhara. Murahara Railway Station (near to Banka), Banka Junction railway station (near to Banka) are the Rail way stations reachable from near by towns. How ever Bhagalpur Junction railway station is major railway station 40 KM near to Kharhara

Deoghar Airport (ICAO: IN-0090) is located at New Deoghar, in the state of Jharkhand, India. How ever Deoghar Airport is major Airport 75 KM near to Kharhara

Deoghar Airport Airlines and destinations

Tourism
Mandar Parvat also known as Mandar Hill is a small mountain situated in city of Bounsi. On top of the hill are a Hindu and a Jain temple. A carnival is organised every year at Makar Sakranti.

References

Cities and towns in Anga Desh
 
Cities and towns in Banka district